Ornithinibacillus halophilus is a Gram-positive, moderately halophilic, rod-shaped and motile bacterium from the genus of Ornithinibacillus which has been isolated from brine from the Aran-Bidgol Salt Lake in Iran.

References

External links 

Type strain of Ornithinibacillus halophilus at BacDive -  the Bacterial Diversity Metadatabase

Bacillaceae
Bacteria described in 2013